The Dudley, Stourbridge and District Electric Tramways Company operated an electric tramway service between Dudley and Stourbridge and also other lines in the neighbourhood between 1899 and 1930.

History

On 2 April 1898 the Dudley and Stourbridge Steam Tramways Company was purchased by British Electric Traction

A programme of modernisation was undertaken and the service was converted for electric traction. The first electric service ran on 26 July 1899.

In April 1900 the company declared a net profit amount of £4,309 10s for the year ending December 1899. The share capital of the company was £200,000 divided into 20,000 5% cumulative preference shares of £5 each, and 20,000 ordinary shares of £5 each. By mid 1900 the British Electric Traction Company held 19,707 ordinary shares, of which 11,496 were purchased and the remainder allocated in part payment for the electrical conversion. 

Extensions were opened as follows: 
19 October 1900 from Queen's Cross in Dudley to Five Ways at the end of Cradley Heath High Street
7 December 1900 the Kingswinford branch
1 November 1902 Stourbridge to Lye and The Hayes 
13 December 1902 Stourbridge to Wollaston Junction 
19 December 1904 Old Hill to Blackheath

On 29 September 1902, the company took over ownership of the Kinver Light Railway for the sum of £60,000 (equivalent to £ in ).

For the Whitsun weekend in 1904, the tramway saw impressive passenger numbers. The total for the four days commencing Saturday was over 185,000 which at fares of no more than 3d per journey represented an income of £1,100.  The Dudley to Stourbridge section was the most popular. Of the 64,073 passengers carried on the Monday, 31,000 travelled between Dudley and Stourbridge with trams running every 5 minutes.

On 1 July 1904 ownership was transferred to the Birmingham and Midland Tramways Joint Committee, a subsidiary of British Electric Traction.

On 1 April 1924 the company took over some of the routes of the South Staffordshire Tramways Company.

The depot was situated in Amblecote on corner of Stourbridge Road and Collis Street. It was 4 track shed opened in October 1905. It was expanded with an additional 2 tracks in 1908, and a further track was added around 1914. It closed in May 1926 and used as a tram store until 1930.

Closure

Route closures occurred on the following dates:
1926 Dudley to Kingswinford, Stourbridge to Kingswinford, and Stourbridge to Wollaston 
1927 Stourbridge to Lye, and Old Hill to Blackheath  
1929 Dudley to Cradley Heath 
1 March 1930 Dudley to Stourbridge, and Dudley to Wednesbury.

Survivals

Four vehicles are known to have survived:
5 (built 1920)  Tram 5 entered service in 1920 with the Dudley, Stourbridge and District Company. At just over 32 feet long it accommodates 34 seated passengers and has two manually operated doors at each end. Withdrawn in 1930, it was sold for secondary use as a summer house before eventually being preserved in 1973. Restored by the Llangollen Railway in 2015-2016, Tram 5 is in the final commissioning stages and is expected back in operation in Summer 2017 at Black Country Living Museum.
36 (built 1901) Information
75 (built 1919) Information
102 (built 1920) Information

References

External links
Dudley and Stourbridge Tramways at the British Tramway Company Badges and Buttons website.

Tram transport in England
3 ft 6 in gauge railways in England